Stuart Klipper (born 1941 in Bronx, New York City) is an American photographer.

Biography
He lived in Stockholm, Sweden, but then moved to his current residence in Minneapolis, Minnesota in 1970.

He lived in Brooklyn Heights as well as the near to it Cobble Hill neighborhood (also in Brooklyn, New York) soon after graduating from the University of Michigan in 1962, and before he moved to Minneapolis in 1970.

Klipper has made six journeys to Antarctica to take photographs. He has also worked in Greenland, Iceland, Svalbard, Alaska, and the area of Lapland irradiated by the Chernobyl disaster. Klipper became one of approximately 400 people to have stood at both the South Pole and the North Pole on July 15, 2009, when he visited the North Pole.

Other major forays have taken Klipper across the deserts of Israel and Sinai as well as the tropical rain forests of Costa Rica. Klipper's work has also taken him to Northern Australia, Patagonia, Tierra del Fuego, Sri Lanka, and Pakistan.

He has logged thousands of miles traveling at sea while photographing on all of the Earth's oceans and seas.

For over 30 years, Klipper traveled through the 50 United States, capturing photographs that crystallize the defining characteristics of American regions. He also photographed major physics and astronomy research installations throughout the United States and the Anasazi ruins of the Southwest.

Klipper has also photographed the cemeteries of World War I and memorials of the Western Front.

Klipper's photographs have been exhibited in and collected by major museums from both the United States and overseas. These include New York City's Museum of Modern Art, the San Francisco Museum of Modern Art, The Art Institute of Chicago, The Minneapolis Institute of Arts, the Walker Art Center, The Jewish Museum, The Israel Museum, The Victoria and Albert Museum, the Bonn Kunsthalle, and the Moderna Museet in Stockholm, Sweden.

The Guggenheim Foundation, The Bush Foundation, the McKnight Foundation, and the Minnesota State Arts Board have all awarded Klipper multiple grants.

Notable exhibitions
Klipper has exhibited across the United States, as well as the Israel Museum, Jerusalem, Israel; Moderna Museet, Stockholm, Sweden; Fotogalleriet, Oslo, Norway; United States embassy, Santiago, Chile; Victoria and Albert Museum, London, UK; Kunsthalle of the German Republic, Bonn, Germany and the Canterbury Museum, Christchurch, New Zealand

Grants, honors, and fellowships

John Simon Guggenheim Memorial Foundation, 1979, 1989 
Bush Foundation (St. Paul),  1981, 1992
National Endowment for the Arts, 1976, 1979
National Endowment for the Humanities, 1981
McKnight Foundation, St. Paul/Mpls. – three grants
The Minnesota State Arts Board – three grants
The Jerome Foundation, 2003
The Bogliasco Foundation (N. Y. C. & Genoa, Italy), 2003
The National Science Foundation's Antarctic Artists and Writers Program, 1989, 1992, 1993, 1999, 2000
 Nominee, McKnight Distinguished Minnesota Artist Award, 2005, 2006, 2007
Finalist, Bush Enduring Visions Award, 2008
Nominee, MacArthur Fellowship, 2008

Klipper was recipient of the United States Navy Antarctic Service Medal, 1989

Notable commissions

The State of Texas, Cray Research Corp., the State of Minnesota, First Banks Systems (Mpls.), the Valspar Corp. (Mpls.), the University of Minnesota.

Solo exhibitions

Disparate Geographies, Schmidt Dean Gallery in Philadelphia, 1998.
Sixteen polar photographs, Arktis -Antarktis, the Kunsthalle des Deutschesrepublic, Bonn, Germany. 1998

Cardinal Points, at the University of Iowa Museum of Art. (Photographs from polar regions: Antarctica and Greenland, the tropical rain forests, the desert regions of Israel and the Sinai, the agricultural Great Plains)-- an exhibition catalogue was published. 1998
At Sea Near the Poles, at the Spencer Gallery, Wickford, R.I. 1999
Antarctica 99/00, Yancey Richardson Gallery, NYC, 2000
Selected Antarctic Work, Berler Gallery, Washington D.C., 2001 (Also shown in Denver and Christchurch, N.Z.

Selected American photographs, The Center for American Places, Harrisonburg, Va., 2001
Photographs from the Arctic and Antarctica, Smith-Dean Gallery, Phila., PA, 2001
Wyoming, Univ. of Wyoming Museum Art, Minneapolis Institute of Art, 2001/02

In the Australian Outback, Gallery 360, Minneapolis, 2002
The United States, Candace Perich Gallery, Katonah, NY, 2002
Rock art, bush fire, termite mounds and other aspects of the outback of the Top End of Australia, Gallery 360, Mpls.,2002

Portraits about Pakistan, 1987, Icebox Gallery, Mpls., 2002
Antarctic 1: Views Along Antarctica's First Highway, Center for Land Use Interpretation, Los Angeles, 2002

The Louisiana Purchase, Groveland Gallery, Minneapolis & Olson-Larsen Gallery, Des Moines, 2003

Selected photographs, Medtronics Corp. corporate headquarters, Minneapolis, 2006
Antarctica, Electrolift Artworks, Minneapolis, Minn. 2006 (+ other venues)
20 Years of photographing Louisiana, The Ogden Museum, New Orleans, 2008
Antarctic Photographs, City Museum of Charleston, S.C., 2009
Local Places – Remote Terrains, Olson Larsen Gallery, Des Moines, Iowa, 2009
The Dead Sea Region, Israel, The Basilica of St. Mary, Minneapolis, 2010

Group exhibitions

Photography of New York City, Minneapolis Institute of Art. 1998
Sea Change, The Center for Creative Photography, Univ. of Arizona, Tucson. (An eponymous book was published in conjunction with the exhibition and is in national distribution), 1998/99
American farms and farming, Candace Perish Gallery, Katonah, NY. (Traveled to Washington D. C.), 1998/99
Views from the Edge of the World, Marlborough Gallery, NYC. 1999
Claiming Title: Australian Aboriginal Artists and the Land,  St, Olaf & Carleton Colleges, Northfield, Minn., 1999
The Infinite and the Intimate; Waterscapes of Stuart Klipper and Frank Gohlke, Dorsky Gallery, N.Y.C. 1999
An Eclectic Focus: Photographs from the Vernon Collection ( + catalogue), Santa Barbara Museum of Art, 1999
Aqua, Gallerie Thierry Marlat, Paris, France 1999
Restructuring the Prairie, Grinnell College, 1999
The Mural as Muse, Deutsches Bank Gallery, NYC, 2000
earth sky, Jackson Fine Art, Atlanta, GA, 2000
Western Panoramas, Huntington Museum, Sta. Barbara, CA, 2001
I Love New York (W. T. C benefit), NYC, 2001
Melodrama, inaugural show, ARTIUM, Vitoria, Spain, 2002
Contemporary Desert Photography, Palm Springs Art Museum, 2005
Antarctic Visions & Voices, Carleton College, Northfield, Minn., 2005
Downriver: New Orleans before the flood, Minnesota Center for Photography, 2006
Midwestern View: Contemporary Photography in Minnesota, Pingyao International Photography Festival, Pingyao, China, 2007
Visions of Music, Acadiana Center for the Arts, Lafayette, La., 2007
Four Antarctic Photographers, Museum of Art, Univ. of Wyo., 2007
Photographs from the Ends of the Earth, Milwaukee Art Museum, 2007
Antarctica on Thin Ice, The United Nations, NYC, 2007
Remembering Dakota, The North Dakota Museum of Art, 2008
Animals –Them and Us, The North Dakota Museum of Art, 2009
NSF Antarctic Artists, Maryland Science Center, Baltimore, Md., 2009
New Orleans photographs, Mill City Museum, Minneapolis, 2009
The Minnesota Eye, College of Visual Arts, St. Paul, 2009

External links
Official Website

Sources

Van Riper, Frank. Southern Exposure: Antarctica". Camera Works. Photo Essay at washingtonpost.com.

Living people
1941 births
Artists from Minneapolis
Artists from Stockholm
Photographers from the Bronx
Photographers from New York (state)
University of Michigan alumni
People from Brooklyn Heights
People from Cobble Hill, Brooklyn